Ormakkayi  (officially Ormakkyaie) is a 1982 Malayalam drama film directed by Bharathan and written by John Paul. The film stars Madhavi, Bharath Gopi, Adoor Bhasi, Nedumudi Venu, Ramu, Krishnachandran and Kunchan in pivotal roles.

Plot
Susanna is released from jail after five years for the accidental murder of a pop singer. She reflects on the events that led up to the tragic event. Nandu, a deaf and dumb sculptor and Susanna's husband.

Cast

Bharath Gopi as Nandagopal
Madhavi as Susanna
Ramu as Peter
Innocent as Rappayi
KPAC Lalitha as Gopi's Sister
Adoor Bhasi as Fernandes
Nedumudi Venu as Balu
Krishnachandran as Krishnan
Sankaradi as Father
Baby Anju as Chakki
Jagannatha Varma as Gopi's Brother-in-Law
Kunchan as Saleem

Soundtrack
The music was composed by Johnson with lyrics by Madhu Alappuzha.

Reception 
Ann Reejan Mammen, the Arts Club Secretary of All Saints College, Thiruvananthapuram for Malayala Manorama wrote, "Bharathan's latest production, speaks volumes and keeps up the high standard of Malayalam movies. All the actors do full justice to their respective roles especially Gopi and Madhavi, Gopi keeps up the high standard of acting excellence. This movie can be recommended to all with no age bar."

Awards
Kerala State Film Awards - 1982
 Second Best Film 
 Best Actor - Bharath Gopi
 Best Actress – Madhavi
 Photography - Vasanth Kumar
 Best Music Director - Johnson
 Best Editor - N.P.Suresh
 Best Art Director - Bharathan

References

External links

1980s Malayalam-language films
Films directed by Bharathan
Films scored by Johnson